Le coeur à l'ouvrage is a 2000 French comedy drama film, directed by Laurent Dussaux.

Plot
Cinema is a big family, even when we made porn films. The day actors, producers and technicians decided to join forces for a "real" film, they do not realize the magnitude of the adventure. Chloe and Julien, the two main actors have other battles to fight, starting with their private lives. Not easy to appear to others as a sexual beast ...

Cast

 Mathilde Seigner as Chloë
 Bruno Slagmulder as Julien
 Amira Casar as Noëlle
 Catherine Jacob as Françoise
 Micheline Presle as Madeleine
 Marc Citti as Bruno
 Patrick Catalifo as Marc
 François Perrot as Ronald
 Christine Citti as Mrs. Combescot
 Cansel Elçin as Hamlet
 Antoine Duléry as The Drama teacher
 Audrey Langle as Ophelia
 Nadia Fossier as Lorraine
 Margot Abascal as Sophie
 Sophie Gourdin as Marianne
 Emmanuel Vieilly as Pierrot
 Thierry Kazazian as Thierry
 Maher Kamoun as Eric
 André Chazel as Roger
 Martine Erhel as Liliane
 Tonino Benacquista as Tattooer

References

External links

2000 films
2000s French-language films
2000 comedy-drama films
French comedy-drama films
2000s French films